The Confederación de Trabajadores Unitaria (CTU) is a trade union centre in the Dominican Republic.  It was formed by the merging of four previous unions. It is affiliated with the International Trade Union Confederation.

References

Trade unions in the Dominican Republic
International Trade Union Confederation